Mai Nguyen Do, also known as Đỗ Nguyên Mai, is a Vietnamese American poet and activist from Santa Clarita, California. They attended College of the Canyons from where they received their associate degrees in history and the liberal arts and sciences.

Their 2016 debut poetry collection Ghosts Still Walking was nominated by the members of the international Science Fiction and Fantasy Poetry Association for an Elgin Award for Book of the Year in 2017. They are the winner of the 2019 Locked Horn Press Publication Prize.

Writing 
Đỗ's poetry is influenced by their Vietnamese American identity and by their deep spiritual faith. When asked about influences on their writing, they have responded with several different sources of inspiration, including the words of ancient Vietnamese female writers and political figures like the Trưng sisters and writers such as Lady Murasaki and Frances Hodgson Burnett.

Their debut poetry collection, Ghosts Still Walking, was published by Platypus Press in 2016. Their second poetry collection, Battlefield Blooming, is scheduled to be released in spring of 2019 by Sahtu Press. The release of Ghosts Still Walking was noted by Vietnamese language newspaper Viet Bao for its timely release on the anniversary of the Fall of Saigon.

Political involvement 
Aside from being a poet, Đỗ has been an ardent advocate for the arts and for Vietnamese American political and cultural development. They often combine these lines of advocacy not only through community organizing and writing poetry, but also by being vocal on how issues such as immigration policy and police brutality have impacted the Southeast Asian American community.

References

External links
 In Rambutan Literary, a Home for Southeast Asian Voices from Around the Globe — Paul Christiansen for Saigoneer, March 2018
 Official website of Do Nguyen Mai
 'Groundbreaking' Asian-American Poets to Read With Immigrant, Refugee Roots — Frances Kai-Hwa Wang for NBC Asian America, May 2017
 Poet and ‘Rambutan Literary’ editor Do Nguyen Mai navigates culture for a living -- Jam Pascual for Philippine Star, Young Star, March 2017
 Nhà Thơ Nữ Gốc Việt 16 Tuổi Ra Mắt, Đọc Thơ ngày 30 tháng Tư 2016 — Việt Báo, April 2016
 Ghosts Sill Writing: An Interview with Do Nguyen Mai, SPECPO

Living people
American women writers
American writers of Vietnamese descent
American writers
College of the Canyons alumni
Washington College alumni
Year of birth missing (living people)
21st-century American women